"The Race" is a song by American rapper Wiz Khalifa from his third studio album Rolling Papers. The song was written by Khalifa and produced by Eric "E. Dan" Dan and Jeremy "Big Jerm" Kulousek for ID Labs. "The Race" was released as the third single from Rolling Papers on March 8, 2011, and debuted and peaked at number 66 on the Billboard Hot 100.

Charts

References

2011 songs
2011 singles
Wiz Khalifa songs
Songs written by Wiz Khalifa
Atlantic Records singles